Heartland New Zealand is a New Zealand political party founded in 2020. The party is rural-based, and opposes the New Zealand Emissions Trading Scheme, the Paris Agreement, and attempts to limit the environmental impacts of agriculture. The party is led by former Franklin District mayor Mark Ball, who is the party's candidate for Port Waikato. It is backed by Hamilton entrepreneur Harry Mowbray, father of Nick Mowbray, a billionaire who, with his siblings, was on the 2019 NBR Rich List.

History
Heartland did not apply for a broadcasting allocation for the 2020 election, which was allocated in May 2020. The party applied for registration with the Electoral Commission in July, and was registered on 6 August 2020. It had a party list of five people for the 2020 election — tied for the shortest party list with Vision NZ — and Mark Ball was its only electorate candidate.

The party won 914 party votes (0.0% of the total) in the 2020 election, coming last out of the registered parties. Ball came third in Port Waikato, with 8,462 electorate votes.

Ideology
The party has been critical of climate change and water restrictions and has opposed New Zealand's ban on oil and gas exploration.

Election results

House of Representatives

References

2020 establishments in New Zealand
Political parties established in 2020
Agrarian parties
Agrarian parties in New Zealand